The 1930 Albanian Championship was the first edition of the Albanian National Championship, which ran from 6 April until 6 July 1930. It was the first-ever official football competition in Albania run by the newly formed Albanian Football Association. The National Championship was only one of three such tournaments organized during that year by the AFA, the other two being the Youth Championship, and the Military Championship. All three championships were under the sponsorship of Princess Myzejen Zogu. The six teams participating in the tournament were Urani, Teuta, Skënderbeu, Bashkimi Shkodran, Sportklub Tirana and Sportklub Vlora, who were to play a ten-game format, whereby each team would host each of their five rivals once with two points awarded for a win and one point awarded for a drawn game. The two teams with the most points at the end of the regular season of the competition would then enter a championship playoff where they would play each other twice and the champions would be crowned based on the aggregate score of the home and away ties, however this playoff was not actually played due to forfeit.

Sportklub Tirana were declared the inaugural champions of Albania following two technical victories over Skënderbeu in the championship playoffs, taking their seasonal total to seven wins, four draws and one loss.

Teams

Teams by locations

Overview
The competition was the first official national football competition to be held in Albania and it featured six sides from across Albania, which were Urani, Teuta, Skënderbeu, Bashkimi Shkodran, Sportklub Tirana and Sportklub Vlora. Each team played each other twice during two phases, and the top two ranked teams entered the championship playoff which would have been a two-game playoff decided on the aggregate score for the championship title. Each win during the regular season was worth two points, with a  draw worth one point and a loss worth none. The first phase was held between 6 April and 4 May, and the second phase was held between 11 May and 22 June. The playoff finals were planned on 22 June and 6 July, but they did not take place due to Skënderbeu's forfeit of both games. Both games were awarded 2-0 to Sportklub Tirana thus crowning them the first champions of Albania.

The very first game of the first Albanian championship was between Bashkimi Shkodran and SK Tirana, played in 6 April 1930 in Shkodër. It ended with a 3-2 victory for the Shkoder team after a spectacular game. Qazim Dervishi, Paç Koliqi, Gjon Kici scored for the Shkodër team, whereas Rexhep Maçi and Hilmi Kosova scored for SK Tirana. In that first week Skënderbeu lost in Vlora 0-2, in a game directed by an Italian referee, Carlo Lorenzo, whereas in Elbasan, Urani took over Teuta Durrës, 1-0.

League standings

Note: 'Bashkimi Shkodran' is Vllaznia, 'Urani' is KS Elbasani and 'Sportklub Vlora' is Flamurtari

Championship playoff

The Championship Playoff, scheduled for June 29 and July 6, was scratched and KF Tirana was awarded the inaugural  Albanian championship as Skënderbeu were unable to field a team for those matches.

Results

Season statistics

Scoring
 Largest winning margin: 4 goals
Skënderbeu 4-0 Urani
Urani 0-4 Sportklub Tirana
 Highest scoring game: 6 goals
Sportklub Tirana 2-4 Skënderbeu
Sportklub Tirana 3-3 Bashkimi Shkodran
 Most goals scored in a match by a single team: 4 goals
Skënderbeu 4-0 Urani
Urani 0-4 Sportklub Tirana
Sportklub Tirana 2-4 Skënderbeu
 Most goals scored in a match by a losing team: 2 goals
Sportklub Tirana 2-4 Skënderbeu
Sportklub Tirana 3-2 Teuta
Bashkimi Shkodran 2-3 Sportklub Tirana

Top scorers
Incomplete: only statistics from Sportklub Tirana, Skënderbeu and Bashkimi Shkodran are recorded

Team sheets

SK Tirana
Rudolf Gurashi, Abdullah Shehri, Irfan Gjinali, Xhelal Kashari, Vasil Kajano, 
Gjon Sabati, Llazar Miha, Mark Gurashi, Bexhet Jolldashi, Shefqet Ndroqi,
Isuf Dashi, Adem Karapici, Hysen Kusi, Mustafa Begolli, 
Hilmi Kosova, Emil Hajnali, Rexhep Maci and Selman Stërmasi as player-manager.

Skënderbeu
Klani Marjani, S. Grabocka, A. Çani, S. Peristeri, M. Sheko, Y. Tomçe, V. Karoli, Xh. Dishnica, Aristotel Samsuri, Anton Mazreku, S. Kandili, Vaso Polena.

Bashkimi Shkodran
H. Llukaçeviç, N. Luka, H. Staka, M. Halili, Sh. Llukaçeviç, A. Paçrami, Qazim Dervishi, Paç Koliqi, R. Krasniqi, Sh. Koçiçi, L. Radoja, Gjon Kiçi

References

Sources
Albania - List of final tables (RSSSF)
Dead Link
  Dead Link
 

Kategoria Superiore seasons
1
Albania
Albania